The stripe-faced greenbul (Arizelocichla striifacies) is a species of the bulbul family of passerine birds. It is found in Africa from south-eastern Kenya to south-western Tanzania.

Taxonomy and systematics
The stripe-faced greenbul was originally described in the genus Xenocichla (a synonym for Bleda), then classified in Andropadus and, in 2010 re-classified to the new genus Arizelocichla. Some authorities have considered the stripe-faced greenbul to be a subspecies of the stripe-cheeked greenbul.

References

stripe-faced greenbul
Birds of East Africa
stripe-faced greenbul
Taxa named by Oscar Neumann